Joseph Clegg (1 May 1869 – 1902) was an English footballer who played in the Football League for Accrington and Bury.

References

1869 births
1902 deaths
English footballers
Association football midfielders
English Football League players
Accrington F.C. players
Bury F.C. players